Gosarling Gewog (Dzongkha: སྒོ་གསར་གླིང་) is a gewog (village block) of Tsirang District, Bhutan. Its old name was Goseling.

References 

Gewogs of Bhutan
Tsirang District